The Ever After High doll franchise has spawned a web series whose episodes were released on their website and YouTube. The web series is organized into chapters, each of which contains various shorts. The first few shorts were released on May 30, 2013. Some of the YouTube shorts have been compiled into longer episodes that are available to watch on Netflix, along with new episodes that are advertised as "Netflix Originals." Some of the episodes are longer, such as the episode "Thronecoming", which premiered on Nickelodeon on 
November 2, 2014 as a television special. The feature film, "Spring Unsprung", was released as a Netflix exclusive on February 6, 2015.

The theme song was composed by Gabriel Mann and Allison Bloom, and was performed by Keeley Bumford. A live-action music video was released on October 15, 2013, featuring Stevie Dore as a high school senior and four younger girls dancing at a campus.

Series overview

The Beginning (2013)

Chapter 1 (2013)

Chapter 2 (2014)

Chapter 3 (2015)

Chapter 4 (2016)

Specials
In addition to the regular webisodes, Ever After High has released several feature-length presentations and compilation episodes.

References

Ever After High